Corylus maxima, the filbert, is a species of hazel in the birch family Betulaceae,
native to southeastern Europe and southwestern Asia, from the Balkans to Ordu in Turkey.

The filbert is similar to the related common hazel, C. avellana, differing in having the nut more fully enclosed by the tubular involucre. This feature is shared by the beaked hazel C. cornuta of North America, and the Asian beaked hazel C. sieboldiana of eastern Asia.

Uses

The filbert nut is edible, and is very similar to the hazelnut (cobnut). Its main use in the United States is as large filler (along with peanuts as small filler) in most containers of mixed nuts. Filberts are sometimes grown in orchards for the nuts, but much less often than the common hazel.

The purple-leaved cultivar Corylus maxima 'Purpurea' is a popular ornamental shrub in gardens.

Language
In Oregon, "filbert" is used for commercial hazelnuts in general. Use in this manner has faded partly due to the efforts of Oregon's hazelnut growers to brand their product to better appeal to global markets and avoid confusion.

The etymology for 'filbert' is Norman French.  Saint Philibert's feast day is 20 August (old style) and the plant was possibly renamed after him because the nuts were mature on this day.

References

maxima
Flora of Europe
Flora of the Caucasus
Flora of Western Asia
Edible nuts and seeds
Garden plants of Europe
Ornamental trees
Taxa named by Philip Miller